Camron "Cam"  Blais Johnson (born April 12, 1999) is an American football wide receiver from Madisonville, Kentucky who currently plays for the Arizona State Sun Devils in the Pac-12 Conference. He previously played for the Vanderbilt Commodores in the Southeastern Conference.

Early life 
At the age of 12, Johnson and AAU basketball teammates Gavin Schoenwald and Darius Garland made the decision to play high school basketball together and chose to enroll in 7th grade at Brentwood Academy in Tennessee. Schoenwald would become a teammate of Johnson's at Vanderbilt, while Garland played hoops at Vanderbilt before becoming the 5th overall pick in the 2019 NBA Draft for the Cleveland Cavaliers.

High school career 
At Brentwood, Johnson was a four-time all-state, four-time all-region and three-time state champion in football.   He lettered in football, basketball and track, and won a combined 13 state titles.  As a football recruit, he was a consensus four-star prospect and ESPN Top 300 prospect.

College career 
Johnson signed a letter of intent to play at Vanderbilt on December 20, 2017, and officially enrolled in June 2018.

In 2018, Johnson saw action in 4 games as a true freshman before suffering a season-ending lower leg injury while blocking in a game against South Carolina.

Johnson started 9 games in 2019 as a redshirt freshman, and led Commodore receivers in touchdowns.

Johnson was named pre-season All-SEC third team in 2021 by Pro Football Focus.

On January 18, 2023, Johnson announced on Twitter that he had signed with Northwestern University football via the transfer portal.

References

External links 

 Vanderbilt Commodores Profile

1999 births
Living people
People from Madisonville, Kentucky
Players of American football from Kentucky
American football wide receivers
Vanderbilt Commodores football players